The Caller (Norwegian: Varsleren, 2009) is a crime fiction novel by Norwegian crime fiction author Karin Fossum, the tenth in the Inspector Konrad Sejer series, released 2009 by Random House, and published in English in 2011.

Reception

Kenneth Turan of the Los Angeles Times said that The Caller provided the chills, and that it "will put you away, no questions asked". Goodreads gave The Caller 3.77 stars, based on user-generated ratings. The Irish Times praised the novel, saying that it was "A contemporary Patricia Highsmith, her (Fossum's) offbeat obsession with the psychology of the criminal mind, and the human cost of the criminal activity, pays off handsomely yet again."

References

Novels by Karin Fossum
Novels set in Norway
Norwegian crime novels
2009 Norwegian novels